Hong Yeong-mi (born 2 February 1968) is a South Korean former cyclist. She competed in the women's individual road race at the 1988 Summer Olympics. She was also part of the South Korean delegation at the 1990 Asian Games.

References

1968 births
Living people
South Korean female cyclists
Olympic cyclists of South Korea
Cyclists at the 1988 Summer Olympics
Cyclists at the 1990 Asian Games
Place of birth missing (living people)
Asian Games competitors for South Korea
20th-century South Korean women
21st-century South Korean women